Agdistis huemeri is a moth in the family Pterophoridae. It is known from Iran and Turkmenistan (Kopet Dag).

References

Agdistinae
Moths of the Middle East
Moths described in 2002